Xanthophyllum is a genus of about 109 species of trees and shrubs, of the plant family Polygalaceae; (under the Cronquist system it was previously placed in the monotypic family Xanthophyllaceae). The generic name is from the Greek meaning "yellow leaf", referring to how the leaves are often yellow when dry.

Description
Xanthophyllum species grow as trees or shrubs. Their twigs are often smooth and are coloured green or yellow. Leaves, when not drying yellow, dry green or dark brown. Flowers feature five petals. Fruits of some species are considered edible, e.g. X. ecarinatum, X. obscurum and X. stipitatum.

Distribution and habitat
Xanthophyllum grows naturally from India in tropical Asia to northern Australia. The majority of species grow in lowland rainforest. Some species grow at higher altitudes in hill or montane forests. Others occur in peatswamp or kerangas forests.

Species
, the following is a list of accepted species:

Xanthophyllum adenotus 
Xanthophyllum albicaule 
Xanthophyllum amoenum 
Xanthophyllum ancolanum 
Xanthophyllum andamanicum 
Xanthophyllum angustigemma 
Xanthophyllum annamense 
Xanthophyllum beccarianum 
Xanthophyllum bibracteatum 
Xanthophyllum bicolor 
Xanthophyllum bombayanum 
Xanthophyllum borneense 
Xanthophyllum brachystachyum 
Xanthophyllum bracteatum 
Xanthophyllum brevipes 
Xanthophyllum brigittae 
Xanthophyllum bullatum 
Xanthophyllum burkillii 
Xanthophyllum celebicum 
Xanthophyllum ceraceifolium 
Xanthophyllum chartaceum 
Xanthophyllum clovis 
Xanthophyllum cochinchinense 
Xanthophyllum cockburnii 
Xanthophyllum colubrinum 
Xanthophyllum contractum 
Xanthophyllum crassum 
Xanthophyllum cucullatum 
Xanthophyllum discolor 
Xanthophyllum eberhardtii 
Xanthophyllum ecarinatum 
Xanthophyllum eglandulosum 
Xanthophyllum ellipticum 
Xanthophyllum erythrostachyum 
Xanthophyllum eurhynchum 
Xanthophyllum excelsum 
Xanthophyllum ferrugineum 
Xanthophyllum flavescens 
Xanthophyllum fragrans 
Xanthophyllum geesinkii 
Xanthophyllum geminatum 
Xanthophyllum griffithii 
Xanthophyllum hainanense 
Xanthophyllum havilandii 
Xanthophyllum heterophyllum 
Xanthophyllum impressum 
Xanthophyllum incertum 
Xanthophyllum inflatum 
Xanthophyllum ionanthum 
Xanthophyllum korthalsianum 
Xanthophyllum laeve 
Xanthophyllum lanceatum 
Xanthophyllum lateriflorum 
Xanthophyllum lineare 
Xanthophyllum longum 
Xanthophyllum macrophyllum 
Xanthophyllum malayanum 
Xanthophyllum manickamii 
Xanthophyllum montanum 
Xanthophyllum monticola 
Xanthophyllum neglectum 
Xanthophyllum ngii 
Xanthophyllum nigricans 
Xanthophyllum nitidum 
Xanthophyllum novoguinense 
Xanthophyllum obscurum 
Xanthophyllum octandrum 
Xanthophyllum oliganthum 
Xanthophyllum ovatifolium 
Xanthophyllum pachycarpon 
Xanthophyllum palawanense 
Xanthophyllum papuanum 
Xanthophyllum parvifolium 
Xanthophyllum pauciflorum 
Xanthophyllum pedicellatum 
Xanthophyllum penibukanense 
Xanthophyllum petiolatum 
Xanthophyllum philippinense 
Xanthophyllum poilanei 
Xanthophyllum pseudoadenotus 
Xanthophyllum pubescens 
Xanthophyllum pulchrum 
Xanthophyllum punctatum 
Xanthophyllum purpureum 
Xanthophyllum ramiflorum 
Xanthophyllum rectum 
Xanthophyllum reflexum 
Xanthophyllum resupinatum 
Xanthophyllum reticulatum 
Xanthophyllum retinerve 
Xanthophyllum rheophilum 
Xanthophyllum rufum 
Xanthophyllum schizocarpon 
Xanthophyllum stipitatum 
Xanthophyllum subcoriaceum 
Xanthophyllum suberosum 
Xanthophyllum sulphureum 
Xanthophyllum sylvestre 
Xanthophyllum tardicrescens 
Xanthophyllum tenue 
Xanthophyllum tenuipetalum 
Xanthophyllum trichocladum 
Xanthophyllum velutinum 
Xanthophyllum venosum 
Xanthophyllum virens 
Xanthophyllum vitellinum 
Xanthophyllum wrayi 
Xanthophyllum yunnanense 
Xanthophyllum zeylanicum

References

External links

 
Fabales genera
Taxonomy articles created by Polbot
Fabales of Asia